Guglielmo Oberdan, (born Wilhelm Oberdank) (February 1, 1858 - December 20, 1882) was an Italian irredentist. He was executed after a failed attempt to assassinate Austrian Emperor Franz Joseph, becoming a martyr of the Italian unification movement.

Biography

He was born in the city of Trieste, which was Austrian at the time. His mother was a German woman from Šempas in the County of Gorizia and Gradisca, while his father, Valentino Falcier, was a Venetian soldier in the  Austrian army. He did not acknowledge his son, so Wilhelm took his mother's surname. He was educated in an Italian cultural milieu, embraced irredentist ideas and Italianized his name to "Guglielmo Oberdan". In 1877 he enrolled at Vienna's College of Technology (now Vienna University of Technology) where he studied engineering. As he supported the idea of independence for all of the empire's national groups he resented the occupation of Bosnia-Herzegovina by Austria-Hungary and therefore deserted from the Austro-Hungarian Army because he did not want to take part in military activities there. Instead, he fled to Rome to continue his studies. In the Italian capital he adopted irredentist ideas, aiming at the annexation to Italy of the Italian-speaking lands still under Austro-Hungarian rule. In 1882 he met with irredentist leader and co-founder Matteo Renato Imbriani. It was then that he came to the conviction that only radical acts of martyrdom could bring the liberation of Trieste from Austrian rule.

Assassination attempt
In the same year, Emperor Franz Joseph was planning a visit to Trieste as part of the celebration of the 500th anniversary of Habsburg rule. Although the city had earned itself the honorific title of urbs fidelissima ("most faithful city") for its non-participation in the revolutions of the 1840s, the city was nonetheless a hotbed for Italian irredentists. The ceremonies were accompanied by anti-Austrian demonstrations. At this opportunity, Oberdan and Istrian pharmacist Donato Ragosa plotted an assassination attempt on the emperor. Oberdan's attempt failed.

Oberdan was arrested and sentenced to hang by an Austrian court. His mother, Victor Hugo, and Giosuè Carducci appealed for clemency - but in vain. The condemned Oberdan refused all religious rites, stating "I am a mathematician and a freethinker, and do not believe in the immortality of the soul". Just before the execution, he  cried "Viva l'Italia!" (Long live Italy!), which helped establish his later reputation as a martyr of the Italian national cause. Statues of him were erected in towns and cities throughout unified Italy.

Emperor Franz Joseph, who reigned another 35 years, never visited Trieste again.

The subsequent assassination of Archduke Franz Ferdinand in 1914, and the revival of irredentism that followed, harked back to Oberdan's earlier attempt.

Legacy
Various prominent monuments in Italy celebrate Oberdan. In Trieste, one of the central squares carries his name (Piazza Oberdan). In Florence, his name is inscribed in the Obelisk of the Fallen in the Wars of Independence in the square in front of Santa Maria Novella. 

The Slovene writer Boris Pahor wrote a novel with that title, in which he incorporated the events from Oberdan's life. The Italian writer Enzo Bettiza also depicted Oberdan in his novel "The Ghost of Trieste", under the fictitious name of Stefano Nardenk (Narden).

A film adaptation of Oberdan's life was produced in 1915 by Tiber films of Rome. It starred Alberto Collo as Oberdan and was directed by Emilio Ghione, who also played the role of the governor of Trieste. It was one of a number of patriotic, irredentist films produced in Italy during World War One. Emilio Ghione met the irredentist Gabriele D'Annunzio at an invitational showing of the film in Rome and Ghione's inter-titles were praised by D'Annunzio.

In 1924 Francesco Salata published his extensive and well-documented work on Oberdan Guglielmo Oberdan secondo gli atti segreti del processo: carteggi diplomatici e altri documenti inediti, which, however, is to some extent influenced by the mindset of the Fascist regime.

John Gatt-Rutner, biographer of the Trieste writer Italo Svevo, suggests that Svevo - 21 years old at the time of Oberdan's execution - was deeply affected by it. In the aftermath, Svevo started writing regularly for the Trieste Irredentist paper L'Indepedente. He never mentioned Oberdan explicitly - the paper was heavily censored and the Austrian authorities considered any manifestation of sympathy for Oberdan as treason. However, on January 21, 1884, Svevo published a translation of Ivan Turgenev's story "The Worker and the Man with the White Hands", whose protagonist is sent to the gallows for a rebellious act on behalf of the oppressed; Svevo added the remark that "What is really moving is not the death of the man with the white hands, but his self-sacrifice on behalf of people who are unable to appreciate it." Gatt-Rutner states that "Triestines could not miss the allusion to Oberdan, which clearly demonstrates the light in which [Svevo] viewed the matter".

Notes

References

External links
I giorni di Trieste: 1882 – L’impiccagione di Guglielmo Oberdan (2 December 2013)

1858 births
1882 deaths
People from Trieste
History of Trieste
19th-century Italian people
Executed Slovenian people
Executed German people
Executed Italian people
People executed by Austria-Hungary
Italian people of Slovene descent
Italian people of German descent
TU Wien alumni
Freethought
Italian irredentism
1882 in Austria
Failed regicides
People executed for attempted murder
People executed by Austria by hanging